The following lists events that will happen or have happened in 1925 in the Kingdom of Italy.

Incumbents
King – Victor Emmanuel III 
Prime Minister – Benito Mussolini

Events

November
 November 4 – Italian socialist deputy and expert sharpshooter Tito Zaniboni took a hotel room opposite the Palazzo Chigi with the intent of shooting Benito Mussolini with a telescopic rifle when he came out to the balcony to make a speech. Police had been tipped off by an intercepted phone call and stopped the would-be assassin.
 November 7 – Several Italian opposition leaders were arrested in connection with the assassination attempt on Benito Mussolini.
 November 12 – The Italian government agreed to repay its war debt to the United States with a fixed interest rate of 0.4 percent.

Births
1 January – Mario Merz, artist (d. 2003)
4 January – Enrico Perucconi, athlete
5 January – Marcello Costalunga, Italian Roman Catholic prelate (d. 2010)

Companies Founded 

 The house of Fendi was launched in 1925 by Adele and Edoardo Fendi

References 

 
1920s in Italy
Years of the 20th century in Italy
Italy
Italy